Origins is the sixth studio album by Swiss folk metal band Eluveitie. The album was released on 1 August 2014 through Nuclear Blast. It was the last album to include longtime members Anna Murphy, Ivo Henzi, Merlin Sutter and Patrick "Päde" Kistler as band members.

Concept
Origins deals with the Celtic mythology, "or to be more precise, with aetiological tales from Gaul", commented vocalist and front man Chrigel Glanzmann. Glanzmann also created the album artwork for this new offering and goes on to explain: "The album cover of Origins is designed after the hammer/club-shaped 'halo' of Sucellos, as seen on a statue that was found in a shrine of a Gallo-Roman household in today's France. It was created under the scientific supervision of experts from the University of Zürich".

Reception

Upon its release, Origins received generally positive reviews from music critics. Björn Springorum of Metal Hammer said that Origins was "their strongest album to date". Glenn Butler of Powerplay continued the praise saying "Quite simply this album is a magnificent creation from the concept through to the delivery".

Track listing

Personnel

Eluveitie
 Chrigel Glanzmann – harsh vocals, bard harp, whistles, uilleann pipes, mandola, bodhrán
 Ivo Henzi – rhythm guitar
 Merlin Sutter – drums
 Anna Murphy – hurdy-gurdy, clean vocals
 Kay Brem – bass
 Patrick "Päde" Kistler – tin & low whistles, bagpipes
 Rafael Salzmann – lead guitar 
 Nicole Ansperger – fiddle, cello

Guests musicians
 Alexander Morton – male narration on #01, 05, 09 & 16
 Karen Bartke – female narration on #06
 Emily Clays – child narration on #01, 02 & 14
 Maria Körndorfer – violins
 Christian Krebs – cellos
 Fredy Schnyder – hammered dulcimer on #05
 Christine Lauterburg – jodel on #04
 Konan Mevel – binou kozh, pybgorn, additional whistles on #04
 Fabian Hey – gaulish rebel choir on #13
 Michael Müller – gaulish rebel choir on #13
 Samuel Stamm – gaulish rebel choir on #13
 David Horstmann – gaulish rebel choir on #13
 Severin Caluori – gaulish rebel choir on #13
 Sileno Püntener – gaulish rebel choir on #13
 Fabian Agner – gaulish rebel choir on #13
 Marc Betschart – gaulish rebel choir on #13
 Farhad Ahmadi – gaulish rebel choir on #13
 Raphael Knuser – gaulish rebel choir on #13
 Kinderchor des Konservatoriums – children choir on #07
 Christoph Bachmann – children's choir conductor on #07

Chart performance
For the first time in Eluveitie's twelve-year history their album reached number one in Switzerland. On hearing the news the band commented "That is just unbelievable. We are proud, happy, and most of all thankful to you, our fans. Together with you we've achieved the impossible and put metal where it belongs: at the top!". In addition to this, Origins reached number one on Billboard's Heatseekers Albums chart and broke the German top ten; peaking at number six.

References

2014 albums
Eluveitie albums
Nuclear Blast albums
Concept albums